In cell biology, translational efficiency or translation efficiency is the rate of mRNA translation into proteins within cells.

It has been measured in protein per mRNA per hour. Several RNA elements within mRNAs have been shown to affect the rate. These include miRNA and protein binding sites. RNA structure may also affect translational efficiency through the altered protein or microRNA binding.

See also

 List of cis-regulatory RNA elements
 Transterm
 UTRdb

References

External links
  Transterm database online

Cell biology